South Shields Westoe RFC (formerly Westoe RFC) is a Rugby Union Football Club which currently plays in Durham/Northumberland 1 (tier 7 of the English rugby union system) at Wood Terrace, South Shields.  The club changed its name from Westoe RFC to South Shields Westoe RFC in August 2015, using the new name from the 2015-16 season onwards.

History
A family club where sons followed fathers and a traditional club, with a historical seafaring influence through the marine faculty at the college nearby Westoe RFC is South Shields' longest established rugby club. Originally formed in 1875, the club has been on the same ground at Wood Terrace since its formation, after it agreed to level the former ridge and furrow farmland for sub rent with the local cricket club. It has shared the Wood Terrace ground with South Shields Cricket club to this day.

The club was formed when Charlie Green and his friends, all aged 16 to 19, crossed the River Tyne on the Tyne ferry after winning a match against Tynemouth, a prominent local rugby club at the time.

In 2005, South Shields Westoe RFC, to the interest of South Shields, had a notable Intermediate Cup run. In the semi-final, being the underdogs, they beat much fancied Staines for a passage to Twickenham the national stadium, taking many travelling fans.  Unfortunately in the final the first team were beaten by giants Morley R.F.C. from Yorkshire. In the same 2004/05 season the defensive side finished champions in the Division North two, an achievement for the club.

The first XV gained national league status in the 2008/2009 season after a thrilling finale to the season in which they had to beat Beverley away to ensure promotion. This was done in emphatic style and they will now play in national 2 north for the first time in its history.

First team
In 2009/10, the club’s first team competes in the English rugby union league and plays in the National League Two North after being crowned champions of the Northern League One in the 2008/09 season,   the first time the club has been in this division.

First team honours
Durham Senior Cup winners (9): 1882, 1895, 1901, 1914, 1937, 1950, 1951, 1956, 2008
North East 3 champions: 1999–00
Durham/Northumberland 1 champions: 2000–01
North 1 East champions: 2004–05
Intermediate Cup Runners up 2005
North Division 1 champions: 2007–08

Notable current and former players
Joe Shaw, a Newcastle Falcons player
David Wilson, a Bath prop and also an England international
Katy McLean, Darlington Mowden Park R.F.C. and England Women's National Rugby Union Team

References

External links
 Official Site
 League Table
Club Details

English rugby union teams
Rugby clubs established in 1875
Sport in South Shields